The Des Moines River is a tributary of the Mississippi River in the upper Midwestern United States that is approximately  long from its farther headwaters. The largest river flowing across the state of Iowa, it rises in southern Minnesota and flows across Iowa from northwest to southeast, passing from the glaciated plains into the unglaciated hills near the capital city of Des Moines, named after the river, in the center of the state. The river continues to flow at a southeastern direction away from Des Moines, later flowing directly into the Mississippi River.

The Des Moines River forms a short portion of Iowa's border with Missouri in Lee County. The Avenue of the Saints, a four-lane highway from St. Paul, Minnesota to St. Louis, Missouri, passes over this section; the highway is designated Route 27 in both Iowa and Missouri, and was completed in the early 21st century.

Hydrography
The Des Moines River rises in two forks. The West Fork (the main branch) rises out of Lake Shetek in Murray County in southwestern Minnesota. It flows south-southeast into Emmet County, Iowa, past Estherville. The East Fork rises out of Okamanpeedan Lake in northern Emmet County on the Iowa-Minnesota border and flows south, through Algona.

The two forks join in southern Humboldt County, approximately 5 miles (8 km) south of Humboldt at Frank Gotch State Park. The combined stream flows roughly southward through Fort Dodge. South of Boone it passes through the Ledges State Park. It flows through downtown Des Moines, then turns generally southeastward, flowing through Ottumwa. It forms approximately 20 miles (32 km) of the border between Iowa and Missouri before joining the Mississippi from the northwest at Keokuk.

It receives the Boone River from the northeast approximately 20 miles (32 km) southwest of Fort Dodge. It receives the Raccoon River from the west in the city of Des Moines. Above the city of Des Moines, it is impounded to create the Saylorville Lake reservoir. About midway below Saylorville and above Ottumwa, near Pella, the river is impounded to create the Lake Red Rock reservoir.

History
 One of the earliest French maps that depicts the Des Moines (1703) refers to it as "R. des Otentas," which translates to "River of the Otoe"; the Otoe Tribe lived in the interior of Iowa in the 18th century. The Meskwaki and Sauk people referred to the river as "Ke-o-shaw-qua" (Hermit's River), from which Keosauqua, Iowa, derives its name. The Dakota Indians, who lived near its headwaters in present-day Minnesota, referred to it as "Inyan Shasha" in their Siouan language. Another Siouan name was "Eah-sha-wa-pa-ta," or "Red Stone" river, possibly referring the bluffs at Red Rock or the reddish Sioux Quartzite bedrock near its headwaters.

The origin of the name Des Moines is obscure. Early French explorers named it La Rivière des Moines, literally meaning "River of the Monks." The name may have referred to early Trappist monks who built huts near the mouth of the river at the Mississippi.

William Bright writes that Moines was an abbreviation used by the French for Moingouena or Moingona, an Algonquian subgroup of the Illinois people. The Native American term was /mooyiinkweena/, a derogatory name applied to the Moingouena by the Peoria people, a closely related subgroup. The meaning of the native word, according to an early French writer, is visage plein d'ordure, or in plain English, "shit-face", from mooy-, "shit", -iinkwee, "face", and -na, "indefinite actor".

The 1718 Guillaume Delisle map (pictured) labels it as "le Moingona R."

During the mid-19th century, the river supported the main commercial transportation by water across Iowa. River traffic began to be superseded by the railroads constructed from the 1860s.

Flooding

Catastrophic flooding occurred along the Des Moines River during the Great Flood of 1851, nearly destroying the new town of Des Moines. Residents had never previously experienced a major flood, and river towns lacked levees and substantial bridges that could withstand flooding. In 1851, 74.5 in (191.5 cm) of rain fell in Iowa, a record that holds to this day. The worst flooding occurred May to June in the Des Moines River Basin. Major flooding in 1851 occurred in Bentonsport, Croton, Bonaparte, Des Moines, Eddyville, Farmington, Iowaville, Keosauqua, Muscatine, Oskaloosa, Ottumwa, Red Rock, and Rochester.

The river has a history of seasonal flooding. For example, in May 1944 the Riverview Park had just opened for the season on May 19, 1944. At around dawn on May 23, the levee began to collapse. The river was too much to hold back.

The Great Flood of 1993 on the river and its tributary the Raccoon, in the summer of 1993, forced the evacuation of much of the city of Des Moines and nearby communities. In another period of flooding, on June 13, 2008, officials issued a voluntary evacuation order for much of downtown and other areas bordering the Des Moines River. The river had reached flood stage in many locations, and Mayor Frank Cownie said the evacuations were an attempt "to err on the side of citizens and residents."

Cities and towns

Algona, Iowa (East Fork)
Armstrong, Iowa (East Fork)
Bonaparte, Iowa
Bradgate, Iowa (West Fork)
Chillicothe, Iowa
Currie, Minnesota
Dakota City, Iowa (East Fork)
Des Moines, Iowa
Douds, Iowa
Eddyville, Iowa
Eldon, Iowa
Emmetsburg, Iowa (West Fork)
Estherville, Iowa (West Fork)
Farmington, Iowa
Fort Dodge, Iowa
Fraser, Iowa
Graettinger, Iowa (West Fork)
Humboldt, Iowa (West Fork)
Irvington, Iowa (East Fork) 
Jackson, Minnesota
Johnston, Iowa
Keokuk, Iowa
Keosauqua, Iowa
Leando, Iowa
Lehigh, Iowa
Livermore, Iowa (East Fork)
Ottumwa, Iowa
Petersburg, Minnesota (West Fork)
Rutland, Iowa (West Fork)
St. Joseph, Iowa (East Fork)
Windom, Minnesota

Variant names
According to the Geographic Names Information System, the Des Moines River has also been known as:
La Riviere des Moins
Le Moine River
Monk River
Nadouessioux River
Outontantes River
River Demoin
River of the Maskoutens
River of the Peouareas

See also
List of Iowa rivers
List of longest rivers of the United States (by main stem)
List of Minnesota rivers
List of longest streams of Minnesota
List of Missouri rivers
Illinois Country
French colonization of the Americas

References and notes

External links

Des Moines History
DesMoinesRiver.org
U.S. Army Corps of Engineers: Des Moines River Basin

Rivers of Iowa
Rivers of Minnesota
Rivers of Missouri
Tributaries of the Mississippi River
Borders of Iowa
Borders of Missouri
Rivers of Cottonwood County, Minnesota
Rivers of Lee County, Iowa
Rivers of Monroe County, Iowa
Rivers of Murray County, Minnesota
Rivers of Emmet County, Iowa
Rivers of Kossuth County, Iowa
Rivers of Humboldt County, Iowa
Rivers of Webster County, Iowa
Rivers of Boone County, Iowa
Rivers of Wapello County, Iowa
Rivers of Clark County, Missouri